Smith Volcano, also known as Mount Babuyan, is a cinder cone on Babuyan Island, the northernmost of the Babuyan group of islands on Luzon Strait, north of the main island of Luzon in the Philippines. The mountain is one of the active volcanoes in the Philippines, which last erupted in 1924.

The volcano is politically located in the Municipality of Calayan, Cagayan province, the town that has jurisdiction over the Babuyan Islands except Fuga Island.

Physical features
Layers of basaltic lava flows are evident south of the volcano.

Smith Volcano is one of the probably five Pleistocene-to-Holocene volcanic centers on Babuyan Island (also known as Babuyan de Claro Island) with Smith, the youngest volcano on the island. The largest on the island is Babuyan Claro (also known as Mt. Pangasun), an active stratovolcano with two well-preserved summit craters  in diameter, located in the center of the island. Babuyan Claro is about  peak-to-peak southeast of Smith Volcano, which is the north-westernmost summit on the triangular-shaped island.

Eruptions
Smith Volcano has erupted six times, the last of which was in 1924.

Emergency investigation of 1993
A team of volcanologists from the Philippine Institute of Volcanology and Seismology (PHIVOLCS) Quick Response Team conducted an investigation on July 8, 1993 following reports of unusual volcanic activity at Babuyan Island. Results of the survey showed that Smith Volcano was quiet with no volcanic earthquakes recorded during the survey.

See also
 List of potentially active volcanoes in the Philippines
 List of inactive volcanoes in the Philippines

References

External links
 Philippine Institute of Volcanology and Seismology (PHIVOLCS) Smith Volcano Page

Stratovolcanoes of the Philippines
Volcanoes of the Luzon Strait
Mountains of the Philippines
Active volcanoes of the Philippines
Landforms of Cagayan